Larry Stefanki (born July 23, 1957), is an American tennis coach and former professional tennis player.

Tennis career
He played for nine years starting in 1979, reaching a career-high ranking of World No. 35 in singles after winning the Indian Wells Masters at La Quinta in 1985 as well as three in doubles. He is one of three Stefanki brothers to have played on the varsity tennis team at the University of California, Berkeley, from 1977 until 1979 under coach Bill Wright.  As a freshman in 1976 at Foothill College, he won the California Junior College Championship in Singles and Doubles.

Coaching
He is more renowned as a tennis coach, having trained such players as John McEnroe, Marcelo Ríos, Yevgeny Kafelnikov, and Tim Henman amongst others. Ríos and Kafelnikov both achieved their number 1 tennis rankings while under his guidance, and Henman reached a career-high of 4 under his tutelage.

Stefanki was also the coach of Fernando González, after taking over this role from Horacio de la Peña in May 2006. Under Stefanki the Chilean reached back-to-back finals in Vienna, the Madrid Masters and Basel in 2006 and the 2007 Australian Open final —a tournament in which he eased past the likes of Lleyton Hewitt, James Blake, Rafael Nadal, and Tommy Haas— which saw González, 26, reach a career-high of #5 in the ATP rankings.

Stefanki was the coach of American tennis player Andy Roddick until his retirement in 2012. He is credited with improving Roddick's tactics and all-court game and helping him reach the semifinals of the 2009 Australian Open, the fourth round of the 2009 French Open for the first time, the 2009 Wimbledon final for the third time, winning the 2010 Sony Ericsson Masters in Miami and the 2010 Brisbane International in Brisbane, Australia.  Stefanki has recently been working with Olympic developmental hopefuls in Los Angeles, CA.
He and his wife and three sons now live in Encinitas, CA.

ATP career finals

Singles: 1 (1 title)

Doubles: 7 (3 titles, 4 runner-ups)

ATP Challenger and ITF Futures finals

Singles: 1 (1–0)

Doubles: 1 (1–0)

Performance timelines

Singles

Doubles

References

External links
 
 

1957 births
Living people
American male tennis players
American tennis coaches
California Golden Bears men's tennis players
People from Elmhurst, Illinois
Tennis people from Illinois